Ezekiel's Tomb, located in Al Kifl, Iraq, is believed by Jews and Muslims to be the tomb of the biblical prophet Ezekiel. Today it forms part of the Al-Nukhailah Mosque complex. For religious Jews, it is the oldest and most important Jewish religious site in Iraq.

Description

According to the 8th-century rabbinical text Pirkei De-Rabbi Eliezer, Ezekiel was buried in Babylonia and mention of his tomb is first made by the 10th-century sage Sherira Gaon. Ever since, Babylonian Jews were known to have visited the tomb and only in the 12th-century did Muslims begin to associate the site with a Quranic prophet. Medieval explorer Petachiah reported in around 1180 that the Jews held the keys to the site and relates that between 60,000 and 80,000 Jews converged on the tomb during the week of Sukkot. Benjamin of Tudela mentioned several synagogues at the location and noted that Muslim notables also frequented the site to pray.

In 1860, the tomb became a source of contention when Muslims attempted to wrest control of the site. The British Consul in Baghdad attempted to resolve the issue of ownership and wrote that the Jews claimed that "the tomb has been in their possession for upwards of 2,000 years and that their right to it has never before been questioned". Upon the intervention of the Anglo-Jewish Association, a government emissary from Constantinople decided in favor of the Jews. At the turn of the 20th century, the Gazetteer of the Persian Gulf, Oman and Central Arabia stated that the tomb is "more venerated by Jews than it is by Muhammadans."

Until the mid-20th century, over 5,000 Jews used to come to the tomb from Baghdad and other major cities during Passover. During this period, the tomb walls contained various inscriptions including three poems honouring various donors. An adjoining room contained five tombs said to belong to five Geonim. Another room was referred to as "Elijah's Cave," and a third room contained the tombs belonging to the prominent Daniel family of Baghdad who were custodians of the site. A Hebrew plaque above the doorway dating from 1810 read "this is the tomb of our master Yehezkel the Prophet, son of Buzi the Kohen, may his merit shield us and all Israel. Amen."

After the fall of Saddam Hussein in 2003, the authorities redeveloped the tomb complex and converted the old synagogue courtyard into a Muslim prayer area.  Some Jewish inscriptions from the tomb chamber were removed and replaced with Koranic verses. The large new Al-Nukhailah Mosque currently encompasses the tomb structure, Muslims believing the tomb to be that of an Islamic prophet Dhul-Kifl, often identified as Ezekiel.

On the walls inside Hebrew script appears under a dome with medieval Islamic floral designs.

The site was protected while under the control of Saddam Hussein. In 2020, the Synagogue beside Ezekiel's Tomb was being made over into a mosque.

See also
 Tomb of the Prophet Hazkiel

References

External links
 Ancient Holy Site Faces Modernization – slideshow by The New York Times
 Unique Pictures Of The Ancient Torah Ark Inside The Ezekiel Shrine By Kobi Arami
 Unique Pictures Of Inside The Ezekiel Shrine Rooms By Kobi Arami 
 Unique Pictures Of The Ancient Synagogue At The Ezekiel Shrine By Kobi Arami
 Unique Pictures Of The Five Tombs Of Geonim(were the presidents of the two great Babylonian, Talmudic Academies of Sura and Pumbedita) Room At The Ezekiel Prophet Shrine By Kobi Arami
 Unesco.org – The Site of Thilkifl
 Babylon's forgotten tomb, a symbol of Iraq's ancient Jewish heritage
 Jewish Shrine of Prophet Ezekiel’s Tomb Open to Visitors in Iraq's Shi'ite Heartland

Tombs in Iraq
Ezekiel
Tombs of biblical people
Jewish pilgrimage sites
Babil Governorate